Glenda León is a Cuban artist born in Havana, in 1976.

León received a graduate degree in visual arts from the Instituto Superior de Arte (ISA) in Havana, while also graduating from the Academy of Media Arts Cologne in Cologne, Germany in 2007. She is noted for her body of work spanning from drawing to video art, including installation, objects, and photography. León is "interested in interstices between visible and invisible, between sound and silence, between ephemeral and eternal." She is currently based in Havana and Madrid.

Awards 
Her internationally acclaimed work has received prizes such as The Pollock-Krasner Foundation Award and residencies like Couvent des Recollets, in Paris and Fonderie Darling, in Montreal.

Public collections 
Her works belong to the permanent collections of the Centre Georges Pompidou, Montreal Museum of Fine Arts, Museo Nacional de Bellas Artes de La Habana, Museum of Fine Arts, Houston, USA, and the Pérez Art Museum Miami.

Artistic career 
León began her Visual Art studies at 12 years old and started showing at a professional level in the year 1999. She also studied Classical Ballet and Philology at the University of Havana, where she got a BA in Art History. The very beginning her work appeared new, in the context of Cuban art, because of her peculiar approach to conceptualism. The use of natural and artificial flowers, texts, sounds and materials like hair and chewing gum were part of her first works.  For example, her work titled "Chewed Line from Chewed Ideas series" is a photograph of a piece of gum stretched over a wide distance, creating the effect of abstracting the object.

León has exhibited in the Havana and Venice biennials since 2012.  Some of her best known installations are Interpreted World, Lost Time and the videos Inversion, Every Breath and Destiny. Her work has been published and reviewed by different art magazines and newspapers such as Bomb Magazine, ArtNexus, ArtForum, ArteCubano among others.

A recurring theme in Léon's work is the juxtaposition of the natural and the artificial. In 2004, Léon conducted a large-scale outdoor installation in Montréal, entitled "Esperanza (Out of Season)", in which she adhered fake branches and leaves to the trees in a public park - a work that only became visible with the passing of the season, as the trees' leaves slowly and naturally dropped away, revealing the imitation branches in stark contrast. Léon reprised this project for Site Santa Fe's 2014 Biennial of the Americas, "Unsettled Landscapes."

Many of Léon's works concern the aesthetics of sound, working with "the space where sound and the visual merge," as she describes it. Her 2012 solo exhibition at Magnan Metz in New York, Listening to Silence, focused on the relationship between the visual world and musical compositions, in a series of works made by superimposing empty musical scores over photographs of nature, suggesting that the visual patterns found in the world - the arrangement of birds in the sky, drops of rain on a sheet of glass, the result of a game of dice - could be "played" like music.

In 2013, she produced a major solo exhibition at the Château des Adhémar, in Montélimar, France, where she exhibited various works on paper, sculptures, and installations, including "Wasted Time," a large pile of sand with an hourglass at the top, representing lost time.

In 2013 she took part in the Cuban Pavilion at the 55th Venice Biennial, where she showed a project entitled Music of the Spheres, a spherical glass music box suspended from the ceiling that played a 30-second, looped composition whose musical notes relate to the position of the planets in the solar system on a given day.

Exhibitions

Selected solo exhibitions 
 2016: Galeria Juana de Aizpuru, Madrid, Spain
 2020: Changwon Sculpture Biennale
 2015: Centro Atlántico de Arte Moderno
 2021: Arte Contemporánea de Vigo
 2020: Museo Extremeño e Iberoamericano de Arte Contemporáneo 
 2022: Aichi Triennale
 2021:15th Cuenca Biennial
 2021: Guangzhou Image Triennial
 2018: Dakar Biennale
 2021: Pilar Juncosa and Sotheby’s Biennial Award for Artistic Creation
 2020: DKV Prize
 2005 & 2020: Pollock-Krasner Foundation Grant

Selected group exhibitions 
 2015: Havana Biennal, Havana, Cuba
 2014: SITElines 2014: Unsettled Landscapes, Site Santa Fe, Santa Fe, NM
 2013: 55th Venice Biennale, Venice, Italy
 2000: First National Festival of Video Art at The Ludwig Foundation of Cuba

References

External links 

Glenda Leon at Havana Cultura
Centre Georges Pompidou 
La Condición Performática 

1976 births
Living people
20th-century Cuban women artists
21st-century Cuban women artists
Artists from Havana
Instituto Superior de Arte alumni